The 2006–07 season was the 101st season in the existence of RC Lens and the club's 16th consecutive season in the top-flight of French football. In addition to the domestic league, Lens participated in this season's editions of the Coupe de France, the Coupe de la Ligue and UEFA Cup.

Season summary
Lens finished fifth, one point away from Champions League qualification. Francis Gillot subsequently resigned as manager, but remained with the club as a scout.

First-team squad
Squad at end of season

Left club during season

Competitions

Overview

Ligue 1

League table

Results summary

Results by round

UEFA Cup

First round

Group stage

Round of 32

Round of 16

Notes and references

Notes

References

Lens
RC Lens seasons